Arthur Monroe Free (January 15, 1879 – April 1, 1953) was an American lawyer and politician who served six terms as a United States representative from California from 1921 to 1933.

Biography 
He was born in San Jose, California and graduated from Stanford University in 1901 and from its law department in 1903. That same year, he was admitted to the bar and commenced practice in San Jose. He moved to Mountain View and was a city attorney from 1904 to 1910. He was the District Attorney of Santa Clara County from 1907 to 1919. He voluntarily retired and resumed the practice of law in San Jose.

Free was a delegate to the Republican state conventions in 1914 and from 1920 to 1936.

Congress 
He was elected as a Republican to the Sixty-seventh and to the five succeeding Congresses (March 4, 1921 – March 3, 1933). He was an unsuccessful candidate for reelection in 1932 to the Seventy-third Congress. He resumed the practice of law in San Jose, where he died in 1953. He was buried in Oak Hill Memorial Park.

In Congress he served on several committees, notably the House Merchant and Marine Fisheries Committee, and the House Immigration and Naturalization Committee. He was known for successfully introducing and championing the federal statue that created Moffett Federal Airfield. In 1929, Free wrote a short book about Herbert Hoover.

Arthur's son Lloyd A. Free was a founder of the Institute for International Social Research.

The Arthur Monroe Free House is listed on the National Register of Historic Places. The cottage in Mountain View that Free purchased in 1894 is now the home of the Michelin Star Restaurant, Chez TJ.

References
Citations

Sources

External links

 

1879 births
1953 deaths
San Francisco Bay Area politicians
Republican Party members of the United States House of Representatives from California
Burials at Oak Hill Memorial Park
20th-century American politicians
Politicians from San Jose, California